The Forni Dolostone, also known as the Dolomia di Forni, is a Late Triassic (Norian, or Alaunian in the local biochronology) dolomite geological formation in northeastern Italy. The formation was deposited in a lagoonal to shallow marine environment.

Description 
The Dolomia di Forni is composed mainly of dark, often cherty, well-bedded dolostone that is frequently thinly laminated and sometimes slumped. Thicker laminae are graded and represent distal turbidites. The basinal facies preserving the tetrapod remains are composed mainly of distal turbidites and carbonate mud deposited by fallout.

Fossil content 
The following fossils have been reported from the formation:

Other reptiles
 Langobardisaurus tonelloi
 Megalancosaurus preonensis
 ?Drepanosaurus unguicaudatus

Fish

 Pseudodalatias barnstonensis
 Sargodon tomicus
 Thoracopterus martinisi
 ?Eopholidophorus forojuliensis
 Holophagus sp.
 Saurichthys sp.

Arachnids
 Friularachne rigoi

Crustaceans

 Acanthochirana triassica
 Antrimpos colettoi
 A. noricus
 Archaeopalinurus levis
 Dusa denticulata
 D. longipes
 Microcaris minuta
 Pseudocoleia mazzolenii
 Rosenfeldia triassica
 Glaessnericaris sp.
 Glyphea sp.

Flora
 Brachyphyllum sp.
 Coniferales indet.

References

Bibliography 
 F. M. Dalla Vecchia. 2019. Seazzadactylus venieri gen. et sp. nov., a new pterosaur (Diapsida: Pterosauria) from the Upper Triassic (Norian) of northeastern Italy. PeerJ 7(e7363)
 F. M. Dalla Vecchia and P. A. Selden. 2013. A Triassic spider from Italy. Acta Palaeontologica Polonica 58:325-330
 F. M. Dalla Vecchia. 2004. An Eudimorphodon (Diapsida, Pterosauria) specimen from the Norian (Late Triassic) of north-eastern Italy. Gortania - Atti del Museo Friulano di Storia Naturale 25:47-72
 F. M. Dalla Vecchia. 2003. A review of the Triassic pterosaur record. Rivista del Museo Civico di Scienze Naturali "E. Caffi" Bergamo 22:13-29
 S. Renesto, F. M. Dalla Vecchia, and D. Peters. 2002. Morphological evidence for bipedalism in the Late Triassic prolacertiform reptile Langobardisaurus. Senckenbergiana Lethaea 82:95-106
 F. M. Dalla Vecchia. 2000. A wing phalanx of a large basal pterosaur (Diapsida, Pterosauria) from the Norian (Late Triassic) of NE Italy. Bollettino della Societa Paleontologica Italiana 39(2):229-234
 S. Renesto. 2000. Bird-like head on a chameleon body: new specimens of the enigmatic diapsid reptile Megalancosaurus from the Late Triassic of Northern Italy. Rivista Italiana di Paleontologia e Stratigrafia 106:157-180
 G. Muscio. 1997. Preliminary note on a specimen of Prolacertiformes (Reptilia) from the Norian (Late Triassic) of Preone (Udine, north-eastern Italy). Gortania - Atti del Museo Friulano di Storia Naturale 18:33-40
 A. Garassino, G. Teruzzi, and F. Vecchia. 1996. The macuran decapod crustaceans of the Dolomia di Forni (Norian, Upper Triassic) of Carnia (Udine, NE Italy). Atti della Societa Italiana di Scienze Naturali e del Museo Civico di Storia Naturale di Milano 136(1):15-60
 F. Bizzarini and G. Muscio. 1995. Un nuovo rettile (Reptilia, Prolacertiformes) dal Norico di Preone (Udine, Italia Nordorientale). Nota preliminare [A new reptile (Reptilia, Prolacertiformes) from the Norian of Preone (Udine, N.E. Italy). Preliminary Note]. Gortania - Atti del Museo Friulano di Storia Naturale 16 (1994):67-76
 F. M. Dalla Vecchia. 1995. A new pterosaur (Reptilia, Pterosauria) from the Norian (Late Triassic) of Friuli (northeastern Italy). Preliminary note. Gortania - Atti del Museo Friulano di Storia Naturale 16:59-66
 A. Tintori and D. Sassi. 1992. Thoracopterus Bronn (Osteichthyes: Actinopterygii): a gliding fish from the Upper Triassic of Europe. Journal of Vertebrate Paleontology 12(3):265-283
 F. M. Dalla Vecchia. 1991. Note sulla stratigrafia, sedimentologia e paleontologia della Dolomia di Forni (Triassico Superiore) nella Valle del Rio Seazza (Preone, Friuli-Venezia Giulia) [Note on the stratigraphy, sedimentology, and paleontology of the Dolomia di Forni (Upper Triassic) of the Rio Seazza Valley (Preone, Friuli-Venezia Giulia)]. Gortania - Atti del Museo Friulano di Storia Naturale 12(90):7-30
 F. M. Dalla Vecchia, G. Muscio, and R. Wild. 1989. Pterosaur remains in a gastric pellet from the Upper Triassic (Norian) of Rio Seazza Valley (Udine, Italy). Gortania - Atti del Museo Friuliano di Storia Naturale 10:121-132
 G. Pinna. 1988. Un nuovo esemplare giovanile di Drepanosaurus unguicaudatus del Norico di Val Preone (Udine) [A new juvenile specimen of Drepanosaurus unguicaudatus from the Norian of the Preone Valley, Udine]. Atti della Società Italiana di Scienze Naturali - Museo civico di Storia Naturale di Milano 128:80-84
 R. Wild. 1984. A new pterosaur (Reptilia, Pterosauria) from the Upper Triassic (Norian) of Fruili, Italy. Gortania - Atti del Museo Friulano di Storia Naturale 5:45-62
 M. Calzavara, G. Muscio, and R. Wild. 1981. Megalancosaurus preonensis n. g., n. sp., a new reptile from the Norian of Friuli, Italy. Gortania - Atti del Museo Friulano di Storia Naturale 2:49-64

External links 
 Gastric pellet

Geologic formations of Europe
Triassic System of Europe
Triassic Italy
Norian Stage
Dolomite formations
Marl formations
Lagoonal deposits
Shallow marine deposits
Paleontology in Italy